Learning commons, also known as scholars' commons, information commons or digital commons, are learning spaces, similar to libraries and classrooms that share space for information technology, remote or online education, tutoring, collaboration, content creation, meetings, socialization, playing games and studying.  Learning commons are increasingly popular in academic and research libraries, and some public and school libraries have now adopted the model. Architecture, furnishings and physical organization are particularly important to the character of a learning commons, as spaces are often designed to be rearranged by users according to their needs.

Learning commons may also have tools, equipment, makerspaces, and/or publishing services available for borrowing or use. Along with the so-called "bookstore model," which is focused on customer service, bookless or digital libraries, the learning commons or digital commons is frequently cited as a model for the "library of the future."

History and development

Learning Commons have developed across the United States and other countries in academic libraries since the early 1990s, when they were more frequently called Information Commons. Two early examples were the Information Arcade at the University of Iowa (1992) and the Information Commons at the University of Southern California (1994). By 1999, Donald Beagle had noted its emergence as "...a new model for service delivery in academic libraries," and proposed that the model could be characterized by offering "a continuum of service" from information retrieval to original knowledge creation. This approach, often called "one-stop shopping," could be facilitated, Beagle suggested, though the application of strategic alignment, a management approach adapted from IT enterprise planning.  Increased use of the term Learning Commons had become apparent by 2004, when the University of Southern California hosted a national conference titled "Information Commons: Learning Space Beyond the Classroom." Beagle's white paper for this conference proposed a developmental pathway "From Information Commons to Learning Commons," based on a typology of change adapted from research by the American Council on Education. This white paper defined an Information Commons as a library-centric "...cluster of network access points and associated IT tools situated in the context of physical, digital, human, and social resources organized in support of learning.” A Learning Commons, by contrast, was no longer library-centric, as  “…when the resources of the information commons are organized in collaboration with learning initiatives sponsored by other academic units, or aligned with learning outcomes defined through a cooperative process.”  These definitions were later adopted and elaborated upon by Scott Bennett, Yale University Librarian Emeritus.  Since the late 1990s, hundreds of Learning Commons have developed and morphed in response to Web 2.0 technologies and the continuous evolution of libraries and librarians’ functions.  Web 2.0 technologies such as blogs, social networking sites, video sharing sites and web apps, have radically impacted the way that information is exchanged and engaged in.  A learning commons takes these technologies into consideration and then adapts to provide the best possible services to the new 2.0 users and students. A driving force for the institution to place various services in the library are caused by two major reasons.  The first reason is the reduction of space used to house print materials which are of little use to students and faculty compared to digital resources rapidly accessible through internet based services. The second reason for learning commons advances is the prime location on campus that most libraries have managed to secure. The library often frees up space through weeding of the print collections. A synergistic service can develop in support of students with other service departments.

Why a Learning Commons

Students appear to have natural abilities to use emerging technology. But the reality is, while students easily grasp the entertainment and communication value of the devices they use, they need to be taught how these tools can be used in learning and critical thought. This is a task for the Learning Commons.

There is growing consensus among educators that students need to learn
transferable skills in order to work efficiently and successfully in our future world.

To achieve this, students will need to become critical consumers of information, effective problem solvers, capable decision makers and
innovative communicators as well. They will require the skills and ability to
flow with change. And most of all, students will need to understand that
these transferable skills give them the capacity to make a difference in this
world... personally.

A Learning Commons provides boundless opportunity for growth. It is
based on a cross-curricular perspective that recognizes literacy, numeracy,
knowledge, thinking, communication, and application as foundations for
learning how to learn.

A Learning Commons becomes the physical and virtual catalyst where
inquiry, imagination, discovery, and creativity come alive and become
central to growth — personal, academic, social and cultural.

The Role of Differentiated Instruction

An effective Learning Commons will accommodate all learners and address multiple learning styles and learning levels.
In working together, teacher-librarians in partnership with others can modify the process, content, product and environment to meet the needs of a diverse student population. The result will be empowered learners.  The learning commons model creates an ideal environment for the teacher librarian to utilize teaching methods that allow for both formal and informal learning to take place.

Learning Commons, Student Services, and the Institution
A learning commons allows for academic libraries to provide wider ranging and more cohesive services to students and users.  Meshing numerous services maintains the traditional reference and research elements of the classic library while adding exciting new services that support new technologies and service in a larger and more integrated environment. The learning commons reflects a marked shift in our conception of the library, a shift that is driven by our evolving understanding of the library's role in supporting student learning. The emergence of the learning commons as a central element in contemporary library design offers an opportunity to transform the library's role on campus from a provider of information to a facilitator of learning.

Often, libraries and learning commons share responsibility for delivering college-wide outcomes: developing effective research strategies, finding and evaluating the appropriateness of resource materials for a particular topic, honing effective oral and written communication skills, and promoting good study and learning habits.  The goal of a Learning Commons Librarians’ work should be to encourage all students to engage in substantive ways with multiple services in the organization.  Properly implemented in an academic library, this model of library service benefits all parts of the institution.  A cohesiveness and purpose among the diverse elements of the library allows both the library and the school to run more smoothly and efficiently and students’ needs are met in an environment that is designed to provide multiple services in a single location.

The Digital Divide and Learning Commons
The Digital Divide is a very real problem in academic libraries currently and will remain so for the foreseeable future.  This can be a problem in a highly technological library model but when the learning commons work efficiently, the needs of these students are provided for through library orientations, research/reference classes, technology courses, one-on-one assistance, effective and in-library peer assistance.  These services should be developed online as well as in person for the maximum benefit of the student user and the school.

Importance of Physical Space

New or renovated library space is now commonly repurposed to bring students together to work, study, and socialize.  The learning commons typically offer comfortable furniture for both individual and group study, modular furnishings that allow users to customize the environment to suit their needs, access to wireless networks and electrical outlets, multimedia labs and support, and often a cafe accompanied by relaxed food and drink restrictions.  The Learning Commons seeks to expand and integrate the real and virtual choices learners have to share their experiences. Safe, inclusive and welcoming environments throughout a school are imperative to meet the diverse abilities and learning styles of individuals, teams and groups. Virtual learning spaces increase this potential.

Learning Commons promotes Inquiry Based Learning
Through the process of inquiry, individuals construct much of their understanding of the natural and human-designed worlds. Inquiry implies a "need or want to know" premise. Inquiry is not so much seeking the right answer—because often there is none—but rather seeking appropriate resolutions to questions and issues. For educators, inquiry implies emphasis on the development of inquiry skills and the nurturing of inquiring attitudes or habits of mind that will enable individuals to continue the quest for knowledge throughout life.

Challenges to Learning Commons

The challenge is discovering how to reconfigure our current spaces both inside and beyond a school and a school library's walls to reflect this new reality. Access to the technology that makes it possible, obviously, is critical.

Role of the School Library
The school library, a key component of a Learning Commons, has an
integral and transformative role to play in implementing this fresh and
innovative vision for education.

Every member of a school's population will ultimately participate in the
creation of a Learning Commons, but the concept's early coordination and
leadership will rest with school library expertise.

Where properly developed, a school's library is already the hub for
networking and information access. As the Learning Commons’ concept grows, a school library's collection-based facilities will continuously change and expand, creating access-based services suited to a school community's needs.

This process will mean changes in the operations of a school's library. Resource collections will need to be reshaped even more rapidly and readily than they are currently to reflect their communities as well as the world at large. It is the only way a library's access to the global, interconnected and
interactive communication networks of the future.

Learning Commons Transformative Model (LCTM) 

Developed by Dr. Alexander Jones, the LCTM sets clear goals with specific criteria of importance to  measure the correlation with teaching outcomes and use of space and technology. The LCTM model includes Knowledge Building, Collaborative Engagement, Integrative Learning, Fostering Literacy, Creativity and Expression, the Development of Positive Social Maturation, Efficient use of Space and Enhanced Teaching.

References

Further reading
Beagle, Donald. (1999) Conceptualizing an Information Commons, Journal of Academic Librarianship, 25:2, p. 82-89
Beagle, Donald. (2006) The Information Commons Handbook. New York & London: Neal-Shuman Publishers.
Beagle, Donald. (2011) From Learning Commons to Learning Outcomes: Assessing Collaborative Services and Spaces. EDUCAUSE Center for Analysis & Research. Available at:  https://web.archive.org/web/20140512221515/https://net.educause.edu/ir/library/pdf/ERB1114.pdf > 
Bennett, Scott. (2008) The Information or the Learning Commons: Which will we have?  Journal of Academic Librarianship, 34:3,183-187.
Birdsall, William F. (2010): Learning Commons to Communicative Commons: Transforming the Academic Library, College & Undergraduate Libraries, 17:2-3, 234-247
Diggs, Valerie (2009): Teacher Librarian;36, 4; Research Library pg. 32
Heitsch, Elizabeth K. & Holley, Robert P. (2011): The Information and Learning Commons: Some Reflections, New Review of Academic Librarianship, 17:1, 64-77
from library to learning commons: a metamorphosis
Holmgren, Richard A. (2010): Learning Commons: A Learning-Centered Library Design, College & Undergraduate Libraries, 17:2-3, 177-191
 Oblinger, D.G. (2006): Challenging traditional Assumptions and Rethinking Learning Spaces,
Somerville, Mary M.;  Harlan, S. (2008) From Information Commons to Learning Commons and Learning Spaces: An Evolutionary Context. In Schader, Barbara (ed.) Learning Commons: Evolution and Collaborative Essentials. London: Chandos Publishing, 1-36.
Stark, Megan & Samson, Sue (2010): Organized Spontaneity: The Learning Commons, College & Undergraduate Libraries, 17:2-3, 260-272.
Woo, E., Serenko, A., and Chu, S. (2019) An exploratory study of the relationship between the use of the learning commons and students’ perceived learning outcomes. Journal of Academic Librarianship 45:4, 413-419.

Academic libraries
Public commons
Types of library
Educational facilities